Victor Colicchio  (born August 13, 1953) is an actor, screenwriter, musician, and songwriter. His screenwriting credits include Summer of Sam, co-written with actor Michael Imperioli. and High Times' Potluck. As an actor his credits include Inside Man, The Brave One, Goodfellas, The Deli, Bullets over Broadway, The Sopranos, and five episodes of Law & Order.  He also played Slick Rick in New York Undercover. In the 1970s he was involved with New York film collective Total Impact.  He also directed  the documentary Rockin' America, about a multi-band tour of the US that suffers serious problems when the promoter quits.
Colicchio founded Venice Film Production with his then-wife the producer Jeri Carroll.

Bibliography
Summer of Sam (1999, script writer)
High Times' Potluck (2002, script writer)

Filmography

Films
Through the Looking Glass (1976, as Pretty Boy)
Blowdry (1976, as Warren)
Honeymoon Haven (1977, as Jack)
French-Teen (1977, uncredited)
Inside Jennifer Welles (1977, as Burt Hanson)
Joint Venture (1977, uncredited)
Daughters of Discipline (1978, as Bob)
High School Bunnies (1978, as Joe White)
Fiona on Fire (1978, as Ronald)
Chorus Call (1979, as Jody)
Blonde Ambition (1981, uncredited)
Delivery Boys (1985, as Tony)
Q & A (1990, as After Hours Luis Alvarado)
Goodfellas (1990) as Henry's '60s crew #2
Street Hunter (1990, as Mustache Diablo)
True Identity (1991, as Alley Guy #2)
Men Lie (1994, as Ring Man)
Bullets Over Broadway (1994, as Waterfront Hood)
Sweet Nothing (1995, as Armed Bodyguard)
The Keeper (1995, as Officer Corvino)
West New York (1996, as Berto)
Loose Women (1997, as George)
The Deli (1997, as Micky)
Better Than Ever (1997, as Hopper)
Celebrity (1998, as Moving Man in Loft)
Exiled (1998, as Elaine's Waiter)

Arresting Gena (1998, as Gordie)
Summer of Sam (1999, as Chickie)
For Love of the Game (1999, as Heckler)
Reveille (2001, as Jamie)
Friends and Family (2001, as Sammy)
High Times Potluck (2002, as Vic)
Four Deadly Reasons (2002, as Chickie)
Tinsel Town (2005, as Tough Guy)
Inside Man (2006, as Sergeant Collins)
Mattie Fresno and the Holoflux Universe (2007, as Janitor / Devil)
The Brave One (2007, as Cutler)
Motherhood (2009, as Roofer in Truck)
I Love You (2011)
Chinese Puzzle (2013, as Le deuxième avocat)
Long Shot Louie (2013, as Pete Lazzaro)
Act, Naturally (2013, as Italian Ice)

Television
New York Undercover (1994-1995 as Slick Rick)
The Sopranos (1999, as Joe, 1 episode)
Prince Street (2000, 2 episodes)
The Beat (2000, as Super, 1 episode)
Third Watch (2000-2001, as Howell, 2 episodes)
Law & Order: Criminal Intent (2002, as Building Manager)
Law & Order: Special Victims Unit (2003, as Bartender)
Law & Order (1994-2008, 3 episodes)
The Unusuals (2009, as Lowdown Pat, 1 episode)
In the Life with Steve Stanulis (2013, as himself, 1 episode)

References

External links

Male actors from New York City
Living people
1953 births